Michel Pigeon (born 1945) is a Canadian politician. Pigeon was elected to represent the riding of Charlesbourg in the National Assembly of Quebec in the 2008 provincial election. He is a member of the Quebec Liberal Party.

Pigeon received a bachelor's degree in civil engineering from the Laval University. He also made studies at the Imperial College of Science and Technology in London, England.  He later worked as an engineer until 1972 where he worked as a professor in the Department of Engineering at Laval. From 2002 to 2007, he was also rector for the university.

Pigeon defeated the ADQ's Catherine Morissette in Charlesbourg in the 2008 elections.

External links
 
 Liberal Party biography 
 Michel Pigeon's official website 

1945 births
Living people
Canadian civil engineers
Canadian university and college chief executives
Politicians from Quebec City
Quebec Liberal Party MNAs
Rectors of Université Laval
Université Laval alumni
21st-century Canadian politicians
Academic staff of Université Laval